Rahmani is a Muslim surname derived from the Arabic, denoting descent from someone named Rahman. Notable people with the surname include:

 Ali Rahmani, Iranian managing director
 Arsala Rahmani, Afghan politician
 Bakhtiar Rahmani, Iranian footballer
 Jannat Zubair Rahmani, Indian actress
 Minnatullah Rahmani, Indian Islamic scholar
 Khalid Saifullah Rahmani, Indian scholar and jurist of Islam
 Yahya Rahmani Indian social activist 
 Niloofar Rahmani, female Afghani pilot
 Nosrat Rahmani, Iranian poet and writer

See also 

 Rahmaniyya, Sunni Sufi order in Algeria

Arabic-language surnames
Nisbas